This is a list of the municipalities in the state of Acre (AC), located in the North Region of Brazil. Acre is divided into 22 municipalities, which are grouped into 5 immediate regions, which are grouped into 2 intermediate regions.

See also

Geography of Brazil
List of cities in Brazil

References

Acre